Brian Balfour-Oatts (born 1966) is a British art dealer, collector and writer. He published William Scott: A Survey of His Original Prints, a catalogue of William Scott's graphic work.

Early life and 1990s

Born in Edinburgh in 1966, Brian Balfour-Oatts grew up in Hawick in the Scottish Borders, and was a child carer to his mother who suffered from Huntington's disease. Educated at Hawick High School, he left Scotland to seek and take up a position at Sotheby's auctioneers in London, aged 18.

In 1988 he was hired by Mayfair Fine Art in Conduit Street, London as curator and gallery manager, specializing in Impressionist and Modern paintings. Aged 22, he sold a Pablo Picasso portrait of Dora Maar to the collector Heinz Berggruen for an undisclosed sum. The painting became part of the group of 75 works loaned by Berggruen to the National Gallery in London, now in the collection of the Berggruen Museum in Berlin. Other notable transactions included the sale of a painting from the famous Haystack series by Claude Monet, which had been acquired after a protracted negotiation with Daniel Wildenstein of the Wildenstein art dealing dynasty. Despite this promising start, Mayfair Fine Art did not survive the severe downturn in the international art market in 1991, which would last several years.

In 1991, he founded Archeus Fine Art (later ARCHEUS) at 65 New Bond Street in London (1991–2000), focusing largely on German Expressionism.

Balfour-Oatts staged the controversial exhibition The Difficulties of Attribution in 1994 after being introduced, by art dealer Julian Hartnoll, to the famous forger Eric Hebborn. The exhibition of "recently discovered Old Master Drawings", complete with a mock auction catalogue was widely covered in the press and drew large crowds, earning praise and criticism in equal measure. He subsequently purchased the rights to Drawn to Trouble , Hebborn's 1991 confessional autobiography, which was republished as Confessions of a Master Forger  following Hebborn's death in 1996, with an epilogue written by Balfour-Oatts. In 1997 he completed and published The Art Forger's Handbook  from Hebborn's manuscript notes, a book that achieved notoriety amongst the art student and art crime communities, a second-hand copy of which can command a price of several hundred dollars. Speaking about the project in a recent interview with the BBC World Service, he said "I didn't realise what a fuss it would cause and how we would still be talking about it, so much, twenty years later."

During the late 1990s Balfour-Oatts began to deal in Modern British Art, which was exhibited alongside German Expressionist paintings and woodcuts, placing works in public collections such as the Moritzburg Museum, Halle, Germany and the National Portrait Gallery, London, amongst others.

2000s

ARCHEUS moved to 3 Albemarle Street, London (2000–2008) and embarked upon a programme of Modern British and International contemporary art, curated by Balfour-Oatts. In 2005, Balfour-Oatts curated a comprehensive exhibition of William Scott's graphic work and published William Scott: A Survey of His Original Prints , which has become the standard reference work and de facto catalogue raisonné of William Scott's printed works. Other notable exhibitions included the first commercial one-man show of Dan Flavin's work to have been held in London, Nothing As Full As The Air, and The Unseen Hand: Minimalism and Anonymity, featuring rare works by Donald Judd, Carl Andre, Robert Ryman and Agnes Martin in 2005 and 2006.

In 2007, Balfour-Oatts became well known for his part in events that would lead to the reclassification of Andy Warhol's famous 1968 Brillo Boxes by the Andy Warhol Art Authentication Board. Four years earlier, Balfour-Oatts had visited the elderly curator and former director of the Pompidou Centre, Pontus Hultén, at his home in France. In what was seen as a feat of art-dealing detective work 
Balfour-Oatts negotiated the purchase of the last 22 Brillo Boxes remaining in Hultén's collection. These boxes had, according to Hultén, been exhibited in his celebrated 1968 Warhol exhibition held at Stockholm's Moderna Museet, of which institution he had also been director. Balfour-Oatts consulted the Andy Warhol Art Authentication Board prior to completing the purchase, and duly received 22 certificates of authenticity, confirming they were indeed original works by Warhol. 12 of the boxes were sold to the American collector Don Fisher, founder of The Gap, and later presented to San Francisco Museum of Modern Art. The remaining 10 works were sold by Christie's to Warhol's former dealer Anthony d'Offay, who presented the works to the Scottish National Gallery of Modern Art. 
After Hultén's death, it became apparent that most of the Brillo Boxes may not have been manufactured in 1968, and had possibly been made later, under Hultén's direction, with, Hultén claimed, Warhol's permission. In 2007, the Authentication Board declared that it "… cannot determine whether or not these boxes were produced in accordance with the terms of a verbal agreement Pontus Hultén made with Warhol in 1968." The certificates of authenticity remained in place, although the boxes themselves were subsequently reclassified by the Board as "exhibition copies". D'Offay subsequently, and unsuccessfully, sued Christie's.  Legal actions, brought over many years, were cited as the reason for the dissolution of the Andy Warhol Art Authentication Board in 2012.

A further work purchased from Pontus Hultén by Balfour-Oatts, Boulangerie, 1961 by Ed Ruscha, created news for an altogether different reason: having sold to novelist and collector Michael Crichton, the work came to auction as part of the Crichton collection at Christie's in New York in 2010, where it made the second-highest sum ever paid for a Ruscha work on paper at the time, $1.14m.

Current Activity

Brian Balfour-Oatts presently curates and deals for ARCHEUS / POST-MODERN , handling significant secondary market works by Bridget Riley, Sam Francis, Lucian Freud, David Hockney, Ed Ruscha and Pierre Soulages.

Family
Brian Balfour-Oatts is the grandson of military figure Lieutenant-Colonel Lewis Balfour Oatts.

Publications

References

External links
ARCHEUS / POST-MODERN - Artnet 

Art dealers from Edinburgh
1966 births
Living people
People educated at Hawick High School
Art writers